The Goheung Hyanggyo was founded in 1441, during the reign of Joseon Dynasty King Sejong. In 1597 the school was heavily damaged during the Second Japanese Invasion. In 1695 it was moved to the present site and restored with the help of Confucian students from Seongdong town.

The hyanggyo consists of two parts: first, the Myeongnyundang (lecture hall), which contains the Oesam outer gate and the east and west dormitories. The second is the ritual area that includes the Naesam inner gate, Daeseongjeon (Confucian shrine hall), and the east and west Mu. This style of structure forms a Jeonhakhumyo, which means that lecture hall is placed in the front and the ritual hall in the rear. Jeonhakhumyo-type hyanggyos are situated on gently-sloping sites to emphasize the sacredness of the Confucian shrine. Sujik House, next to the Hyanggyo, houses Confucian students.

According to the current curator, the Goheung Hyanggyo was the wealthiest of the Confucian schools during the period just prior to the occupation. During the second occupation, the funds of the Goheung Hyanggyo were confiscated and used to build schools in the area. The occupying Japanese government took credit for building the schools, though the funds used to build the schools were actually those confiscated from the Goheung Hyanggyo.

Rituals are held here every month at dawn; at those times, participants gather in the afternoons and evenings prior, staying overnight in the east dormitory and preparing for the next morning's ceremony. Many other additional activities occur at the Goheung Hyanggyo throughout the year.

Gallery

References

Hyanggyo
Goheung County